The 1978 Pau Grand Prix was a Formula Two motor race held on 15 May 1978 at the Pau circuit, in Pau, Pyrénées-Atlantiques, France. The Grand Prix was won by Bruno Giacomelli, driving the March 782. Eje Elgh finished second and Marc Surer third.

Classification

Race

References

Pau Grand Prix
1978 in French motorsport